Edsbro is a locality situated in Norrtälje Municipality, Stockholm County, Sweden with 488 inhabitants in 2010.

Medieval Edsbro Church lies in Edsbro.

References 

Populated places in Norrtälje Municipality